Chulita Vinyl Club (CVC) is an all-vinyl, all-genre DJ collective whose members are self-identifying women of color. The CVC was formed to provide a safe space in which its members can embrace their heritage through collecting, sharing, and playing music that is culturally significant to them. Since its founding in 2014 the CVC has grown, to seven chapters throughout Texas and California. The CVC, like other all-women DJ collectives, seeks to shatter gender barriers prevalent in the male-dominated DJ scene.

Origins 
The Chulita Vinyl Club was founded by Claudia Saenz in 2014. "Chulita" is a diminutive of the Spanish slang word chula meaning "beautiful", "cute", or "sexy."   Using social media to find women interested in joining her, Saenz formed the first official chapter of Chulita Vinyl Club in Austin, Texas in 2014. Today there are a total of seven chapters in Texas and California.

Ever since its formation the CVC has   news media coverage from local publications, mostly   focussed on the cultural and gender aspects of the CVC.  On November 13, 2017, Univision 14 aired a special report called "Las chulitas de la Bahía" ("The Chulitas of the Bay") that featured members of the Bay Area chapter.

Music and Gigs 
The CVC does not discriminate when it comes to the genres they collect and DJ. The genres they play at gigs vary greatly and include 1960s girl-groups, yé-yé pop, garage girls, punk, indie pop, northern soul, new wave, post-punk, riot grrrl, motown, ska, diy pop, oi!, power pop, twee, chicano oldies, 1960s soul, pop, chicano soul-dies, tejano, mexican rock, mexican punk, latino punk, rocksteady, dancehall reggae, 1970s funk, 1960s psychedelic Peruvian cover songs, cumbia, spanish rock, funk, r&b, oldies, norteños, corridos, and conjuntos. Each member brings a unique sound into the collective based on her personal record collection, whether inherited from family members or purchased at thrift stores, record stores, or flea markets.

The CVC strives to support local members of the community and typically play gigs that support local artists or non profit organizations, especially those that seek to preserve minority culture and eliminate the plight of people of color. The CVC also performs at large music and art festivals such as the annual 20th Street Block Party  . In addition, CVC chapters have residencies at various bars/clubs in their respective cities.  .

In an effort to have their  music reach a larger audience the members of CVC post mixes from their personal collections on the collective's SoundCloud profile.

Membership 
The CVC is an inclusive collective and welcomes people who identify as "women, gender-non-conforming, non-binary, LGBTQ+ and self-identifying people of color." While each member identifies with an individual nationality or culture, many of the members are "Latinas, Tejanas, Chicanas, Xicana and more."  There are chapters in:

 California: Bay Area, Los Angeles, San Diego, Santa Ana
 Texas: Austin - First chapter (2014), Rio Grande Valley,  San Antonio

Accolades 
In 2017 the weekly alternative newspaper The Austin Chronicle named Chulita Vinyl Club the Best All-Vinyl DJ Crew.

Chulita Vinyl Club's SoundCloud profile won the 2018 MORA (Mixcloud Online Radio Awards) for Best Online Music Show, Eclectic category.

References

External links 
Univision 14 (KDTV) special report Las chulitas de la Bahía, November 13, 2017. 

Live DJ session of Bay Area Chapter members at Fault Radio, Oakland, CA, November 17, 2017. 

Interview with CVC founder Claudia Saenz, MalEducados Podcast, April 25, 2017. 
 Chulita Vinyl Club official website

DJing
Women DJs
Organizations established in 2014
Organizations based in Texas